Pyrophorus tuberculifer is a species of click beetle (family Elateridae).

Description 
The basic coloration is  dark brown. The pronotum shows a long backward-pointing tooth. These beetles are bioluminescent by means of  two luminescent light organs at the posterior corners of the prothorax, and a broad area on the underside of the first abdominal segment. Their bioluminescence is similar to that of another group of beetles, the fireflies, although click beetles do not flash, but remain constantly glowing.

Distribution 
This species can be found in Mexico, Cuba, Guadeloupe, Brazil, Paraguay and Argentina.

References 

  Elateridae in SYNOPSIS OF THE DESCRIBED COLEOPTERA OF THE WORLD
 Universal Biological Indexer
 Elateridae de las Antillas
 Cleide Costa Systematics and evolution of the tribes Pyrophorini and Heligmini, with description of Campyloxeninae, new subfamily (Coleoptera, Elateridae)

Elateridae
Bioluminescent insects
Beetles described in 1829
Insects of Guadeloupe